Kossisko Konan (1991/1992–present), known mononymously as Kossisko and formerly known as 100s, is an American singer/rapper and Grammy nominated  songwriter from Berkeley, California. In 2012, Kossisko, as rapper 100s, released his debut mixtape Ice Cold Perm. He was signed to Fool's Gold Records in June 2013. Following the release of the single "Ten Freaky Hoes", it was announced that he would be releasing his second mixtape, an EP titled Ivry, which was released on March 7, 2014 via Fool's Gold. It featured a greater g-funk and disco influence than his debut mixtape. He is also well known for his song "Life of a Mack", which appeared on the soundtrack of the video game Grand Theft Auto V. At the start of 2015, he retired the 100s persona and now performs under the name Kossisko (which is his birth name). As Kossisko, he released his first single "This May Be Me" on February 17, 2015. The track was premiered by The Fader. Later that year, Kossisko released his debut EP, Red White N Cruel. In 2016, Kossisko launched a crowdfunding campaign to help fund his work on a short horror film titled '2037.'

Early life 
Kossisko was born to a Jewish mother and African father. He was raised in Berkeley, California. At age 16, due to disciplinary issues, he was sent by his father to a remote boarding school in Abidjan, inside the Ivory Coast. Kossisko was told that the Africa trip was a vacation, but he was left at the school indefinitely. At the boarding school, he lived in a three-bedroom house with 15 people. He contracted malaria five times. At one point, Kossisko ran away from the boarding school and fled to the local American embassy. Despite his pleas, his parents refused to allow him to return to the U.S., and because he was under the age of 18, he had to remain in Ivory Coast. After his attempt at escape, he was sent to the small town of Bouaflé where he lived with his uncle. Not long after, he and his uncle's family moved to Yamoussoukro. While in Ivory Coast, he learned to speak French. Kossisko returned to the United States in late 2010.

Cultural influence 
Marvel Comics honored the artistry of Kossisko as 100s by remixing the cover of IVRY as a marketing tool for the comic book studios latest project.

Musical career
Kossisko wrote his first song in 2008 and recorded for the first time in early 2010. He began to take rapping seriously in 2011 at the age of 19. Following his stay in the Ivory Coast, Kossisko moved back to Berkeley where he began recording his debut mixtape as 100s titled, Ice Cold Perm. On September 5, 2012, 100s released Ice Cold Perm, which was produced largely by Joe Wax. The cover artwork was inspired by the cover of Snoop Dogg's Tha Doggfather, which he called a classic album. On the mixtape he also collaborated with Main Attrakionz and Ryan Hemsworth. Brandon Soderberg of Spin commented on it saying, "This is snarling, no-nonsense pimp-rap, celebrating exploitation and preemptively lashing out at everyone trying to get anything over on 100s, but it finds a way to complicate those regressive, retro sensibilities". On October 18, 2012, the Noisey subsidiary of Vice premiered the music video for "Brick Sell Phone".

In an interview with Vice later that month, Kossisko said his next project would be titled Sex Symbols, which he had already started recording. He described it as different saying, "It's more influenced by R&B. I've got some singers on there. It's going to be more funky, too. What I wanted to do, as best as I could, was have a fusion between [19]90s mack-rap and late [19]80s pop and soul. Something like Bobby Brown or Rick James." On January 23, 2013, Ice Cold Perm was released for digital download. In early 2013, he went on the Group Hug Tour with Kreayshawn, then performed five shows at 2013's SXSW.

On June 4, 2013, 100s released the music video for "1999". This was followed by the announcement of his signing to A-Trak's Fool's Gold Records later that week. The following month Complex named him a new rapper to watch out for. His song "Life of a Mack" was featured on the video game Grand Theft Auto V, on the station Radio Los Santos. Off the popularity it gained from appearing in the game, 100s released it on September 17, 2013, as his debut single. Around the same time he was featured in an iPhone 5c commercial. Then from October to December 11, 2013, 100s toured with ASAP Ferg on the Turnt x Burnt concert tour. While on tour he released "Keep a Bitch Broke", a new collaboration with Aston Matthews, Joey Fatts and Da$h. He was named one of the ten West Coast rappers to watch for during 2014 by The BoomBox.

On February 26, 2014, 100s released the song "Ten Freaky Hoes" and revealed that he would be releasing a free EP titled Ivry, replacing the previously announced Sex Symbols. "Ten Freaky Hoes" is a "melodic G-funk jam that adds a dose of Californian psychedelia to his formerly frozen atmospherics." Ivry was subsequently set for a March 2014 release. "Ten Freaky Hoes", is also most notably the song that ended the existence of 100s, with a short letter from the artist placed at the end of the music video saying, "To the 100s fans, I appreciate each and everyone of you but its now time for me to count my journey. So this is goodbye. -Kossisko". The EP was then released on March 6, 2014, by Fool's Gold, being premiered by The Fader. It was met with positive reviews from music critics including writers for The Fader, The Washington Post, Stereogum and Fact. Writing for Now, Julia Leconte said "It will make you smile till your face hurts as you press repeat for the 16th time, but to steal one of his song titles, 100s isn't "fuckin around." He presents himself with sophistication, and you take him seriously as a legit mack rapper rather than a farcical Snoop Dogg type wearing ridiculous oversize velvet or fur." Nick Catucci of Entertainment Weekly credited him for bring back g-funk.

In a 2016 interview, Kossisko described feeling "reborn" after he retired the 100s character and reinvented himself as Kossisko. He also explained that his work as 100s was partially related to anger towards his mother after the traumatic experience of being sent to Africa.

Discography

as Kossisko

as 100s

Singles
As featured artist

Filmography

Television

References

External links 
Website
 Kossisko on Twitter
 Kossisko on Instagram
 Kossisko on YouTube
 Kossisko on Facebook

Living people
1993 births
21st-century American male musicians
21st-century American rappers
African-American male rappers
Jewish American musicians
Jewish rappers
Musicians from Berkeley, California
Rappers from the San Francisco Bay Area
West Coast hip hop musicians
21st-century African-American musicians
21st-century American Jews